Oh Seh-wong (born 20 June 1961) is a South Korean basketball player. He competed in the men's tournament at the 1988 Summer Olympics.

References

1961 births
Living people
South Korean men's basketball players
Olympic basketball players of South Korea
Basketball players at the 1988 Summer Olympics
Place of birth missing (living people)